Paris's 20th constituency was one of the 21 French National Assembly constituencies
in the Paris department in the period 1988 to 2012.  The constituency covered three districts of the 19th arrondissement: Pont-de-Flandres, Amérique and Combat.

It was abolished in the 2010 redistricting of French legislative constituencies, which reduced the number of constituencies in Paris to 18.
The territory of the constituency, in the north-east of Paris, mostly moved to the new 16th constituency (apart from a small area of the Quartier du Combat).

Description
After the 1986 French legislative election, the new Prime Minister Jacques Chirac re-established the two-round single-member district electoral system. The number of deputies from Paris was maintained at 21 and the previous (pre-1986) electoral constituencies were therefore reduced from 31 to 21.  The constituency covered three neighbourhoods of the 19th arrondissement, Pont-de-Flandres, Amérique and Combat.
It corresponded to the 29th and part of the 28th constituencies of Paris in the period 1958-86.

In 1999, the Institut national de la statistique et des études économiques estimated the population of the constituency as 116,985 inhabitants.

Historic Representation

The constituency was abolished in 2012 - Cambadélis continued as the deputy for the 16th constituency, which covers almost exactly the same territory.

Election Results

1988

1993

1997

2002

2007

References

Defunct French legislative constituencies
French legislative constituencies of Paris
2010 disestablishments in France
Constituencies disestablished in 2010